The Verbenaceae, the verbena family or vervain family, is a family of mainly tropical flowering plants. It contains trees, shrubs, and herbs notable for heads, spikes, or clusters of small flowers, many of which have an aromatic smell.

The family Verbenaceae includes 32 genera and 800 species. Phylogenetic studies have shown that numerous genera traditionally classified in Verbenaceae belong instead in Lamiaceae. The mangrove genus Avicennia, sometimes placed in the Verbenaceae or in its own family, Avicenniaceae, has been placed in the Acanthaceae.

Economically important Verbenaceae include:
 Lemon verbena (Aloysia triphylla), grown for aroma or flavoring
 Verbenas or vervains (Verbena), some used in herbalism, others grown in gardens

Taxonomy

Tribes and genera in the family and their estimated species numbers:

Casselieae (Schauer) Tronc.
 Casselia Nees & Mart. - 6 species
 Parodianthus Tronc. - 2 species
 Tamonea Aubl. - 6 species

Citharexyleae Briq.
 Citharexylum L. (fiddlewoods) - 60 species
 Rehdera Moldenke - 3 species

Duranteae Bent.
 Bouchea Cham.  - 13 species
 Chascanum E.Mey - 27 species
 Duranta L. - 31 species
 Recordia Moldenke - 2 species
 Stachytarpheta Vahl - 120 species

Lantaneae Endl.
 Aloysia Palau (beebrushes) - 36 species
 Burroughsia Moldenke - 2 species
 Coelocarpum Balf.f. - 6 species
 Diphyllocalyx (Griseb.) Greuter & R.Rankin - 6 species
 Isidroa Greuter & R.Rankin - 1 species
 Lantana L. (shrub verbenas, lantanas) - 100 species
 Lippia L. - 140 species
 Nashia Millsp. - 1 species
 Phyla Lour. (frogfruits) - 5 species

Neospartoneae Olmstead & N.O'Leary
 Diostea Miers - 1 species
 Lampayo Phil. ex Murillo - 3 species
 Neosparton Griseb. - 3 species

Petreeae Briq.
 Petrea L. (sandpaper vines) - 12 species

Priveae Briq.
 Pitraea Turcz. - 1 species
 Priva Adans. - 20 species

Verbeneae Dumort.
 Glandularia J.F.Gmel. - 88 species
 Hierobotana Briq. - 1 species
 Junellia Moldenke - 38 species
 Mulguraea N.O’Leary & P.Peralta - 11 species
 Verbena L. (verbenas/vervains) - 57 species

Unassigned
 Dipyrena Hook. - 1 species
 Rhaphithamnus Miers - 2 species

Excluded genera 
Various genera formerly included in the family Verbenaceae are now treated under other families:
Moved to Acanthaceae
 Avicennia L.

Moved to Lamiaceae

 Amasonia L.f.
 Brachysola (F.Muell.) Rye
 Callicarpa L.
 Caryopteris Bunge
 Chloanthes R.Br.
 Clerodendrum L.
 Congea Roxb.
 Cornutia L.
 Cyanostegia Turcz.
 Dicrastylis J.Drumm. ex Harv.
 Discretitheca P.D.Cantino
 Faradaya F.Muell.
 Garrettia H.R.Fletcher
 Glossocarya Wall. ex Griff.
 Gmelina L.
 Hemiphora (F.Muell.) F.Muell.
 Holmskioldia Retz.
 Hosea Ridl.
 Hymenopyramis Wall. ex Griff.
 Kalaharia Baill.
 Karomia Dop
 Lachnostachys Hook.
 Mallophora Endl.
 Monochilus Fisch. & C.A.Mey.
 Newcastelia F.Muell.
 Oncinocalyx F.Muell.
 Oxera Labill.
 Peronema Jack
 Petitia Jacq.
 Petraeovitex Oliv.
 Physopsis Turcz.
 Pityrodia R.Br.
 Premna L.
 Pseudocarpidium Millsp.
 Pseudocaryopteris P.D.Cantino
 Rotheca Raf.
 Schnabelia Hand.-Mazz.
 Spartothamnella Briq.
 Sphenodesme Jack
 Symphorema Roxb.
 Tectona L.f.
 Teijsmanniodendron Koord.
 Teucridium Hook.f.
 Tripora P.D.Cantino
 Vitex L.

Moved to Oleaceae
 Dimetra Kerr
 Nyctanthes L.

Moved to Orobanchaceae

 Asepalum Marais
 Cyclocheilon Oliv.
 Nesogenes A.DC.

Moved to Phrymaceae
 Phryma L.

Moved to Stilbaceae

 Campylostachys Kunth
 Euthystachys A.DC.
 Stilbe P.J.Bergius
 Thesmophora Rourke

References

External links 

Verbenaceae of Mongolia in FloraGREIF
Verbenaceae in BoDD – Botanical Dermatology Database

 
Lamiales families